The 2022 UIAA Ice Climbing World Championships were held from 26 to 29 January 2022 in Saas-Fee, Switzerland.

Medal summary

Medal table

Men

Women

References

2022 in Swiss sport
International sports competitions hosted by Switzerland
January 2022 sports events in Switzerland
Ice Climbing